Elin Karolina Grindemyr (born 7 February 1983) is a Swedish model. Her first appearance was in the Swedish men's magazine Slitz in the September 2003 issue as a contender for "Annual Sexiest Girlfriend". Despite the fact that she did not win this contest, she has appeared in Slitz several times thereafter.

In May 2005, Grindemyr was voted as the sexiest woman in Sweden by the readers of Slitz.

References

External links

Firewerx.dk/m, Petition, which made it possible for Danish readers of the magazine M! to see her on the frontpage

1983 births
Living people
Swedish female models
People from Norrköping